Elmar Wepper (born 16 April 1944 in Augsburg) is a German actor.

His television credits include Der Kommissar, Unsere schönsten Jahre and Zwei Münchner in Hamburg. His film credits include Cherry Blossoms, Café Europa, Lammbock and Dreiviertelmond. He is also known for dubbing Mel Gibson's voice since the 1980s.

He is the younger brother of actor Fritz Wepper.

References

Further reading

External links

1944 births
Living people
German male voice actors
German male television actors
German male film actors
20th-century German male actors
21st-century German male actors
Male actors from Munich
German Film Award winners